GS may stand for:

Businesses and organizations
 Goldman Sachs, one of the world's largest global investment banks
 Global Star Software, a former Canadian video game publisher
 GS (Swedish union), a trade union in Sweden
 GS Group, a Korean company that is a spin-off from the LG Group
 Columbia University School of General Studies, one of three undergraduate colleges at Columbia University in New York City
 Tianjin Airlines, by IATA code

Music
 GS Boyz (explicitly G-Spot Boyz), an American hip hop group from Arlington, Texas,

Places
 Gansu, a province of China (Guobiao abbreviation GS)
 South Georgia and the South Sandwich Islands (ISO country code GS), a British Overseas Territory in the southern Atlantic Ocean

Science and technology

Biology and medicine
 Gs alpha subunit, a subtype of G-protein coupled receptors
 Gilbert's syndrome, a liver enzyme disorder which can cause elevated levels of serum bilirubin
 Gitelman syndrome, an autosomal recessive kidney tubule disorder
 Geopathic stress, a pseudoscientific condition

Computing
 GS, a group separator character in the C0 control code set
 .gs, Internet country code top-level domain of South Georgia and the South Sandwich Islands
 GS register, in the X86 computer architecture
 Ghostscript, a free software suite for handling PostScript and Portable Document Format (PDF) files
 Apple IIGS, the most powerful model in the Apple II computer line

Other uses in science and technology
 Roland GS, an extension of General MIDI electronic musical instruments' specification by Roland Corporation
 g-force, measure in "g's"
 Geprüfte Sicherheit, a safety mark appearing on technical equipment
 Glide slope, part of the instrument landing system used by aircraft
 Ground segment, in space systems

Sports
 Galatasaray S.K., a Turkish sports club
 Games started, a baseball statistic
 Giant Slalom skiing, an alpine skiing discipline
 Goal shooter, a position in netball
 Golden State Warriors, a professional NBA basketball team based in Oakland, California
 GS Pétroliers (handball), an Algerian handball team

Vehicles

Automobiles
 Citroën GS, a French compact car lineup
 Geely Emgrand GS, a Chinese compact crossover
 Lexus GS, a Japanese executive sedan
 MG GS, a British compact SUV

Trim lines
 Buick Gran Sport, an American high-performance sports package series
 Toyota G Sports, a Japanese high-performance package series

Motorcycles
 BMW GS, a German dual purpose off-road/on-road motorcycle series
 Suzuki GS series, a Japanese road motorcycle series

Other uses
 Gagasan Sejahtera, an informal coalition of opposition Islamist political parties in Malaysia
 General Schedule (US civil service pay scale), a prefix designating a pay grade in the US civil service
 Group Sounds, a genre of Japanese music
 Pokémon Gold and Silver, installments of the Pokémon series of video games

See also

 G (disambiguation)
 ГШ (disambiguation)
 
 
 

 S (disambiguation)
 SG (disambiguation)